Aldo Andrés Araujo (born 3 January 1992) is an Argentine professional footballer who plays as a midfielder for Olimpo on loan from Talleres.

Career
Textil Mandiyú became Araujo's first club in 2012. He remained with Textil Mandiyú until 2014, making fifty-eight appearances and scoring eleven goals; the last two coming during 2014 against Atlético Paraná on 5 October. In January 2015, Araujo joined Torneo Federal A side Talleres. He made his debut on 23 March in a fixture with 9 de Julio, whilst he scored his first Talleres goal in the following September versus Tiro Federal. Araujo won back-to-back promotions as Talleres rose from Torneo Federal A in 2015 to the Argentine Primera División in 2016–17. His first top-flight goal arrived against San Lorenzo on 26 January 2018.

Career statistics
.

Honours
Talleres
Torneo Federal A: 2015
Primera B Nacional: 2016

References

External links

1992 births
Living people
People from Corrientes
Argentine footballers
Association football midfielders
Torneo Argentino B players
Torneo Federal A players
Primera Nacional players
Argentine Primera División players
Textil Mandiyú footballers
Talleres de Córdoba footballers
Nueva Chicago footballers
Club Olimpo footballers
Sportspeople from Corrientes Province